The Eric Chronicle (Swedish: Erikskrönikan) is the oldest surviving Swedish chronicle. It was written by an unknown author (or, less probably, several authors) between about 1320 and 1335.

It is the oldest in a group of medieval rhymed chronicles recounting political events in Sweden. It is one of Sweden's earliest and most important narrative sources. Its authorship and precise political significance and biases are debated, but it is clear that the chronicle's protagonist and hero is Eric, Duke of Södermanland, brother of King Birger of Sweden.

The chronicle is written in knittelvers, a form of doggerel, and in its oldest version is 4543 lines long. It begins in 1229, with the reign of Eric XI of Sweden (d. 1250) but focuses on the period 1250-1319, ending in the year when the three-year-old Magnus IV of Sweden came to the throne. It survives in six manuscripts from the fifteenth century and a further fourteen from the sixteenth and seventeenth.

Example

External links
 Original text in Old Swedish
 Translation into Modern English
 Carl L. Thunberg (2012): Att tolka Svitjod, Göteborgs universitet, pp 47-53.

Publications

References 

Scandinavian chronicles
Swedish literature
13th century in Sweden
14th century in Sweden
Works of unknown authorship